Jordan Michael Clarke (born July 10, 1990) is an American track and field athlete who specializes in the shot put. He holds a personal record  for the event, set in 2015. He was the gold medalist at the 2014 Pan American Sports Festival. Clarke was third at the USA Outdoor Track and Field Championships in 2015.

He was a highly successful college athlete with the Arizona State Sun Devils, winning four NCAA collegiate titles – two indoors, two outdoors. He also medalled at the 2009 Pan American Junior Athletics Championships while there.

Career

Early life
Born in Anchorage, Alaska to Michael and Christine Clarke, he attended Bartlett High School and took part in shot put, discus throw and American football while there (being twice named the school's football captain). After graduation he enrolled at Arizona State University, taking an exploratory major. In his first year there, he redshirted for the Arizona State Sun Devils athletic team and instead competed individually. He received his first international call-up as a result and was runner-up to compatriot Mason Finley at the 2009 Pan American Junior Athletics Championships.

College
He began working with Arizona State's throws coach David Dumble, who was heading a highly successful college throws group. In his first year of collegiate competition, Clarke placed fourth in the shot put at the 2010 Mountain Pacific Sports Federation (MPSF) indoor meet. Outdoors, he was runner-up at the Pacific-10 Conference championships behind fellow Arizona State athlete Ryan Whiting and was part of a school sweep with his fellow alumnus Jason Lewis in third. Clarke was fifth at the NCAA Men's Division I Outdoor Track and Field Championships – a contest won by Whiting. The following year Clarke was second at the MPSF indoor meet and came ninth at the NCAA Men's Indoor Track and Field Championships. With Whiting having graduated, Clarke became the Sun Devils' leading thrower and he continued the team's success at the 2011 Pac-10 Outdoor Championships by winning the shot put, placing runner-up in the discus and coming seventh in the hammer throw. At the end of the year he competed at the national level for a second time, placing 16th overall at the 2011 USA Outdoor Track and Field Championships.

Clarke established himself as America's top collegiate thrower in the 2012 season by winning both the NCAA Indoor Championships and the NCAA Outdoor Championships. Regionally, he was the MPSF indoor champion and the Pac-12 outdoor champion. He again competed in the discus and hammer at the Pac-12 meet, ranking third and second respectively. He entered the 2012 United States Olympic Trials and made the final, coming eighth overall. On distance he ranked in the American top ten for the shot put that season and within the top twenty athletes globally.

Clarke began the 2013 indoor season with a series of throws beyond twenty meters, taking in victories at the MPSF meet and a fourth straight shot put title at NCAA level at the NCAA Indoor Track and Field Championships. He also won the weight throw at the MSPF indoor championships.

Clarke finished at Arizona State having won two NCAA Outdoor titles, two NCAA Indoor titles, and three consecutive titles at the MPSF Conference indoors and the Pac-12 Conference outdoors. His personal bests during his time there ranked him in the top ten of four different throws events. His tally of 24 points across the discus, shot put and hammer at the 2012 Pac-12 Championships made him second to only Dwight Phillips among highest scorers for Arizona State.

Professional
After graduation from Arizona State, he continued to work with coach David Dumble, fitting in time between his mentor's college duties. The latter placed him in the top ten for the discipline globally that season – a new high for the athlete.

He skipped the 2015 indoor season and focused outdoors instead. He made his debut on the 2015 IAAF Diamond League circuit  and came near a personal best at the Golden Gala in Rome to place second behind world champion David Storl, before taking second place again after Joe Kovacs at the New York Diamond League.

Jordan Clarke finished 9th in shot put at 2016 United States Olympic Trials (track and field).

Personal records
Shot put indoor –  (2015)
Shot put outdoor –  (2012)
Discus throw –  (2009)
Hammer throw –  (2013)
Weight throw –  (2013)

National titles
NCAA Men's Division I Indoor Track and Field Championships
Shot put: 2012, 2013
NCAA Men's Division I Outdoor Track and Field Championships
Shot put: 2011, 2012

International competitions

References

External links

Living people
1990 births
Sportspeople from Anchorage, Alaska
American male shot putters
Arizona State Sun Devils men's track and field athletes
World Athletics Championships athletes for the United States
Track and field athletes from Alaska